Rupert Francis Kettle (16 February 1915 – 11 December 1985) was an English cricketer who played three matches of first-class cricket in India between 1944 and 1951. He was the first captain and the first century-maker for Assam.

Life and career
Born in Worcester, Rupert Kettle served in the Gloucestershire Regiment in the Second World War. While stationed in India in 1944 he played a first-class match, staged in aid of the Red Cross Fund, for a Services XI that included several English first-class cricketers and three Test cricketers.

He spent several years in Assam after the war, working as a tea broker. He captained Assam's cricket team in their debut season in the Ranji Trophy in 1948-49, when they played one match, losing by an innings to United Provinces. In his second and final match for Assam, which was Assam's third first-class match, two seasons later, he scored Assam's first first-class century. Going to the wicket in the first innings with the score at 15 for 6, he made 106 not out in a team total of 175, adding 79 in a last-wicket partnership. Assam nevertheless lost by an innings again.

References

External links
 
 

1915 births
1985 deaths
British Army personnel of World War II
English cricketers
Sportspeople from Worcester, England
Assam cricketers